Wide Receiver is the fifth album by American bass guitarist  Michael Henderson. It was released in 1980 by Buddah Records.

Track listing
All tracks composed by Michael Henderson; except where indicated
"You're My Choice" 3:03
"Make Me Feel Like" 4:27
"Reach Out For Me" (Hal David, Burt Bacharach) 3:35
"Wide Receiver" (Michael Henderson, Randall Jacobs)  8:05
"I Don't Need Nobody Else" (Lou Courtney)  4:01
"What I'm Feeling (For You)" (Michael Henderson)  4:03
"Ask The Lonely" (George Hunter, William Stevenson)  3:10
"There's No One Like You" (Randall Jacobs)  4:19 
"Prove It" 4:25

Personnel
Michael Henderson - lead and backing vocals, bass, crowd voices
Randall Jacobs  - guitar, piano, handclaps, crowd voices
Bobby Franklin, Cory Heath, Erik Wallace, Ollie E. Brown, Ron Pangborn - drums
Ray Parker Jr. - rhythm guitar
Ernestro Wilson, Gary Nester, Manon "Zoo" Saulsby - keyboards 
Cory Heath, Lorenzo "Bag Of Tricks" Brown, Miguel Fuentes - percussion
Michael Iacopelli - synthesizer
Sylvester Rivers - acoustic piano
Eli Fontaine - saxophone
Evan Solot - trumpet
Little Sonny - harmonica
Cory Heath, Duane Harris, Gary Nester, Marvin White, Pamela Brown - crowd voices
Carol Hall, Cheryl Norton, Jeanette McGruder, Kathy Kosins, Roz Ryan, Sheila Horne, Venna Keith - backing vocals

Charts

Singles

References

External links
 Michael Henderson-Wide Receiver at Discogs

1980 albums
Michael Henderson albums
Buddah Records albums
Albums recorded at Sigma Sound Studios